Claudio F. Zulianello (born May 29, 1965) is a former Argentinian volleyball player who represented his native country at the 1988 Summer Olympics in Seoul, South Korea, claiming the bronze medal with the men's national team.

External links

1965 births
Argentine men's volleyball players
Living people
Olympic volleyball players of Argentina
Volleyball players at the 1988 Summer Olympics
Olympic bronze medalists for Argentina
Place of birth missing (living people)
Olympic medalists in volleyball
Medalists at the 1988 Summer Olympics